Dániel Rudolf Varga (born 25 September 1983) is a Hungarian water polo coach. He was a member of the gold medal winning Hungary men's national water polo team at the 2008 Beijing Olympics.

He is the older brother of Dénes Varga; they are currently teammates in the Hungarian national team.

Honours

National
 Olympic Games:  gold medal – 2008
 World Championships:  gold medal – 2013;  silver medal – 2005, 2007
 European Championship:  silver medal – 2006, 2014;  bronze medal – 2008, 2012, 2016
 FINA World League:  silver medal – 2005, 2007, 2013, 2014
 FINA World Cup:  silver medal – 2014

278 present in the national team of Hungary.
 Junior World Championships: (silver medal – 2003)
 Junior European Championship: (silver medal – 2002)
 Youth European Championship: (gold medal – 2001; bronze medal – 1999)

Club
 Cup Winners' Cup Winners (1): (2002 – with Vasas)
 LEN Euro Cup Winners (2): (2017, 2018 – with FTC)
 Adriatic League: 2x (2013, 2014 – with Primorje)

 Hungarian Championship (OB I): 7x (2007, 2008, 2009, 2010 – with Vasas; 2015, 2016 – with Szolnok; 2018 – with Ferencváros)
 Hungarian Cup (Magyar Kupa): 5x (2002, 2004, 2005, 2009 – with Vasas; 2014 – with Szolnok)
 Croatian Championship (Prva HVL): 1x (2014 – with Primorje)
 Croatian Cup (Kup Hrvatske): 2x (2012, 2013 – with Primorje)

Awards
 Szalay Iván-díj (2000)
 Faragó Tamás-díj (Best junior player of year): (2001)
 MVP of the Youth European Championship: 2001
 MVP of the Junior European Championship: 2002
 Vasas
 All-Star Team of the World Championship: 2007
 Hungarian Water Polo Player of the Year: 2007, 2013
 All-Star Team of the Olympic Games: 2008
 Junior Príma díj (2008)
 Member of the Hungarian team of year: 2008, 2013
 Ministerial Certificate of Merit (2012)

Orders
   Officer's Cross of the Order of Merit of the Republic of Hungary (2008)

See also
 Hungary men's Olympic water polo team records and statistics
 List of Olympic champions in men's water polo
 List of Olympic medalists in water polo (men)
 List of world champions in men's water polo
 List of World Aquatics Championships medalists in water polo

References

External links
 

1983 births
Living people
Water polo players from Budapest
Hungarian male water polo players
Water polo drivers
Water polo players at the 2008 Summer Olympics
Water polo players at the 2012 Summer Olympics
Water polo players at the 2016 Summer Olympics
Medalists at the 2008 Summer Olympics
Olympic gold medalists for Hungary in water polo
World Aquatics Championships medalists in water polo
Hungarian water polo coaches
20th-century Hungarian people
21st-century Hungarian people